Viktor Lukić (born 6 October 2000) is a Serbian professional footballer who plays as a winger for P.A.E. G.S. Diagoras.

References

External links
 
 

2000 births
Living people
Association football forwards
Serbian footballers
FK Radnik Surdulica players
FK Čukarički players
Serbian SuperLiga players
Serbia under-21 international footballers
Sportspeople from Šabac
21st-century Serbian people